The Warner Revolution I, also marketed as the Spacewalker I, is an American homebuilt aircraft that was designed and produced by Warner Aerocraft of Seminole, Florida. When it was available the aircraft was supplied as a kit or in the form of plans for amateur construction.

The aircraft is intended to be reminiscent of the open cockpit monoplanes of the 1930s, such as the Ryan ST.

Design and development
The Revolution I features a cantilever low-wing, a single-seat, open cockpit with a windshield, fixed conventional landing gear with wheel pants and a single engine in tractor configuration.

The aircraft is made from a combination of wood and metal tubing, covered in doped aircraft fabric. Its  span wing lacks flaps. The standard engine used is the  Continental A65 powerplant.

The Revolution I was later developed into a two-seat model called the Warner Revolution II.

Operational history
In May 2014 two examples were registered in the United States with the Federal Aviation Administration, although a total of three had been registered at one time.

Specifications (Revolution I)

References

External links

Photo of a Revolution I

Revolution I
1990s United States sport aircraft
1990s United States ultralight aircraft
1990s United States civil utility aircraft
Single-engined tractor aircraft
Low-wing aircraft
Homebuilt aircraft